Gary Frank may refer to:

 Gary Frank (actor) (born 1950), American actor 
 Gary Frank (comics) (born 1969), British comics artist